Desh TV, stylized as DESHTV, is a Bangladeshi Bengali-language satellite and cable television channel owned by Desh Television Limited, a part of the Karnaphuli Group conglomerate. It officially commenced broadcasts on 26 March 2009. Desh TV is headquartered in Malibagh, Dhaka. The channel is broadcast via the Bangabandhu-1 satellite.

History 

In mid to late 2000s, the Bangladesh Telecommunication Regulatory Commission granted Desh TV a license to broadcast. The channel was launched on 26 March 2009 via the Telstar 10 satellite by veteran actor and politician Asaduzzaman Noor, who is the former managing director of the channel. Desh TV's aim is to focus on enriching the country's culture, values, and communal harmony, which would strengthen democracy, according to Noor. Later, Bangladesh's national anthem sang at the foot of the Shikha Chironton was broadcast. 

On 25 June 2010, marking the first death anniversary of American singer Michael Jackson, Desh TV aired a special program dedicated to him titled Tribute to the Legend: Michael Jackson. In July 2011, Desh TV premiered Ke Hotey Chay Kotipoti, the Bangladeshi adaptation of the international game show Who Wants to Be a Millionaire?, hosted by Asaduzzaman Noor. In November 2011, Desh TV, along with three other Bangladeshi television channels, signed an agreement with UNICEF to air children's programming for one minute.

The channel began broadcasting on Sky in the United Kingdom on 27 April 2011, but was later removed for unknown reasons on 12 January 2012. On 2 June 2012, Desh TV launched its website. In December 2013, Desh TV aired a special 12-episode miniseries titled Deshe Deshe Juddhaporadh, regarding war crimes committed around the world. Desh TV was one of the nine Bangladeshi television channels to sign an agreement with Bdnews24.com to subscribe to a video-based news agency run by children called Prism in May 2016.

On 18 October 2019, marking the first death anniversary of guitarist and singer Ayub Bachchu, Desh TV aired Sei Tumi, a special program dedicated to him. On 3 March 2022, Desh TV signed an agreement with local telecommunications company Banglalink. Under the agreement, the channel will enjoy Banglalink corporate connection as a valued client, according to a press release. Desh TV announced in July 2022 that Asaduzzaman Noor quit the channel. The channel officially adopted a new logo on 26 October 2022.

Programming 
Desh TV offers a diverse range of programming, including news, entertainment, and sports. It also strongly upholds the culture of Bangladesh. On its thirteenth anniversary on 26 March 2022, the channel announced that it would completely shift to airing news programming, by removing all non-news programs.

List of programming 

 Bakorkhani
 Baranday Roddur
 Bela Obela Sarabela
 Call-er Gaan
 Calling Bell
 Cornet
 Desh Janapad
 Desh Shongbad
 Durpath
 Gaan Ar Gaan
 Jao Pakhi
 Jimmi
 Ke Hotey Chay Kotipoti
 Kolpoloker Golpokotha
 Radio Chocolate
 Radio Chocolate Reloaded
 Sangskriti Saradesh
 Satkahon
 Shimanto
 Shubhro
 Soja Kotha
 Sur Ar Gaan
 Tribute to the Legend
 Total Sports

See also
 List of television stations in Bangladesh

References

External links
 

Television channels in Bangladesh
Television channels and stations established in 2009
2009 establishments in Bangladesh
Mass media in Dhaka